Richard Fagan (April 24, 1947 – August 5, 2016) was an American songwriter and musician. He had six top ten singles and 18 charted singles on the Billboard Country charts.  Fagan's songs have been recorded by Neil Diamond, George Strait, John Michael Montgomery, Clay Walker, Ricochet, Hank Williams, Jr., George Jones, Shania Twain, Patty Loveless, Collin Raye, Shenandoah, The Crickets, Jason & the Scorchers, The Blues Brothers Band and many others.

In 1979, his song "The Good Lord Loves You" was recorded by Neil Diamond and released on the September Morn album.  The song charted in the Billboard Hot 100, peaking at number 67 in April 1980.  Fagan accomplished nine Billboard Country chart singles in the 1990s including two of John Michael Montgomery's number one singles: "Be My Baby Tonight" and "Sold (The Grundy County Auction Incident)".  Fagan had three additional songs on the Billboard Country charts in the 2000s, including the song "Why Can't We All Just Get a Long Neck?" that appears on the Hank Williams, Jr. album, I'm One of You.

On April 26, 2008, Fagan had a physical altercation with his publishing partner and best friend, Tom Oteri. Fagan was arrested for drunk driving after leaving the scene of the fight where Oteri was later found dead, having suffered a heart attack. Fagan was convicted of the drunk driving charge and sentenced to rehabilitative therapy with the support of Oteri's family members who still regarded Fagan as a close friend after the incident.

Biography

Early life and discovery
Richard learned basic guitar skills as a young child and began to refine those skills and singing do-wop in Philadelphia as a teenager.  According to Richard's account, he encountered two other people singing in the Junior High lunch room, suggested some changes while joining along and immediately had new friends and singing companions.  After being drafted into the Army and serving a year in Vietnam, Fagan returned to Philadelphia where, for a while, he was homeless.  He married and had a son, but divorced in 1975.  Tom Oteri discovered Fagan's songwriting talents and invited him to a recording studio audition.  In 1976 Oteri recorded five of Fagan's songs and sent them to various producers but because the recordings did not identify an address or phone number they never received any response.  Bob Gaudio, Neil Diamond's producer, heard one of the songs and hired an ex-FBI agent as a private detective to find the song's author.

Initial success and Mercury Records
In 1978 Bob Gaudio acquired Fagan's song, "The Good Lord Loves You."  The song finally appeared three years later on Diamond's "September Morn" album.    Gaudio also managed to get Fagan signed with Mercury Records and produced his first album.  Fagan relocated to Los Angeles, learned to play piano and recorded the tracks for his first album, "Richard Fagan" which was released the last week of 1979 just about the same time that "September Morn" was released.  Fagan's album received critical acclaim and he recorded the tracks for a second album, "Jiver", but Mercury never released it.

Nashville and country music
Fagan's initial success was not achieved again until he relocated from Los Angeles to Nashville, Tennessee in January 1986.  Within a week of his relocation, he had one of his songs, "Blue Suede Blues", recorded by Con Hunley.  The song reached number 49 on the Billboard Country charts in 1986.  That same first week in Nashville Fagan had another song accepted – "Americana" – by Moe Bandy, which was released in 1988.  In March it reached number 8 on the Billboard Country charts.  and was quickly adopted by George H. W. Bush as a theme song for his Presidential Campaign.

Fagan's songs have appeared on the soundtracks of five Hollywood feature films. He has written a network television theme song, a Presidential campaign song, a national sports anthem, show tunes, gospel songs, comic numbers and a Billboard Country Single of the Year. Working with a variety of collaborators, he has been responsible for such unforgettable hits as "Sold," "Only on Days That End in Y," "I Miss You a Little," "Overnight Male" and "Be My Baby Tonight." Albums containing Fagan songs have sold more than 25 million copies.   "God has always given me a pot of gold," says Richard Fagan. "I think there's a reason for it all. And I guess my being naïve helped me to succeed in Nashville. I didn't know it at the time, but my timing was great."

Death of Tom Oteri
"Their relationship was more like father and son than anything," said Fagan's friend and frequent co-writer Kacey Jones. "Tom rescued Rich from a life situation that would have gone nowhere but bad. He dusted him off and said, 'Your job is to write songs. I'll make sure you have a roof over your head and food and all the things you need to live, and you'll write songs.' "

That arrangement detonated on April 26, 2008, when an argument led to a brawl. Fagan says it was the only time they had ever had a physical fight. Fagan was full of Patron and antidepressants, Oteri high and low on the painkiller Fentanyl, which had been prescribed after he broke a rib. Wounded by Fagan's knife, Oteri yelled at his friend to leave, perhaps out of anger and perhaps for protection. Fagan drove off, drunk, and was arrested for driving under the influence of alcohol. He spent the night in jail, and was on his way home on bail, hoping to make apologies and amends with Oteri, when he was called back to the Harding precinct.

"The detective said, 'Your friend's dead. Murder one,' " Fagan recalled. "My best friend of 32 years. The next day, Tom's son and his daughter and sister came to visit. They said I was crying my eyes out, saying, 'It should have been me.' I did wish I was dead. But I wasn't dead, so what do I do?"

The answer came back from Tom Oteri Jr.: You'll write songs.

"My dad believed in Rich's music," said Oteri Jr., who is now publishing Fagan's songs through his Broadminded Music company. "I can't let all the work they did go to waste. I grew up around Rich, and I've known him all my life, and I know that what happened was an accident. I have to let Rich keep going. It's what my dad would want."

Death
Fagan died on August 5, 2016 in Nashville of liver cancer at the age of 69.

Chart singles written by Fagan
The following is a list of Richard Fagan compositions that were chart hits.

References

1947 births
2016 deaths
Mercury Records artists
People from Nashville, Tennessee
Singer-songwriters from Pennsylvania
Singer-songwriters from Tennessee
American male singer-songwriters
American country guitarists
American acoustic guitarists
American country pianists
American male pianists
American country singer-songwriters
Deaths from liver cancer
Deaths from cancer in Tennessee
Guitarists from Philadelphia
Guitarists from Tennessee
20th-century American guitarists
American male guitarists
Country musicians from Pennsylvania
Country musicians from Tennessee
20th-century American male musicians